Gum Tree Canoe is an album by the American musician John Hartford, released in 1984. It was reissued on CD in 2001 with two additional tracks.

Reception

In a review for AllMusic, critic Brian Beatty wrote:
 
John Lupton of Country Standard Time wrote "this is Hartford at his entertaining best, a bittersweet reminder of how much was lost to us when he passed away".

Track listing
"I'm Still Here" (John Hartford) – 3:26
"Way Down the River Road" (Hartford) – 2:18
"Gum Tree Canoe" (S. S. Steele) – 4:07
"Your Long Journey" (Doc Watson, Rosa Lee Watson) – 2:27
"Jug Harris" (Hartford) – 2:25
"Little Piece of My Heart" (Bert Berns, Jerry Ragavoy) – 3:12
"Take Me Back to My Mississippi" (John Carso) – 3:53
"Lorena" (Joseph Philbrick Webster, Henry DeLafayette Webster) – 4:45
"Wrong Road Again" (Allen Reynolds) – 2:48
"No Expectations" (Mick Jagger, Keith Richards) – 4:03
2001 reissue bonus tracks:
"You Asked Me To" (Waylon Jennings, Billy Joe Shaver) – 3:48
"I Wonder Where You Are Tonight" (Johnny Bond) – 4:13

Personnel
John Hartford – banjo, guitar, fiddle, plywood, vocals
Sam Bush – mandolin
Roy Huskey – bass
Jack Clement – dobro, guitar, ukulele
Jerry Douglas – dobro
Mark Howard – guitar
Marty Stuart – mandolin
Kenny Malone – drums, percussion
Mark O'Connor – fiddle, guitar, mandolin
Billy Lee Riley – French harp
Richard Schulman – vocals
Jeannie Seely – vocals
Tommy Hannum – vocals

Production
Produced by Jack Clement
Richard Adler – remixing
Bob Carlin – mixing
Wes Lachot – mixing
Niles Clement – assistant engineer
Jim Rooney – assistant engineer
Dr. Toby Mountain – mastering

References

John Hartford albums
1984 albums